Raaj may refer to:
 Romit Raj, an Indian actor
 Raaj the Showman, a 2009 Kannada film
 Raaj (film), a 2011 Telugu film

See also
 Raj (disambiguation)
 Raaz (disambiguation)